Hans Peder Johansen Hafslund (1815 - ??) was a Norwegian politician.

He was elected to the Norwegian Parliament in 1859, representing the constituency of Sarpsborg. He worked as a baker in that city. He only served one term.

References

1815 births
Year of death missing
Members of the Storting
Østfold politicians
People from Sarpsborg